Fort Drummond may refer to the following sites:
Fort Drummond (Drummond Island, Michigan), in the United States
Fort Drummond (Queenston Heights), in Ontario, Canada
A name sometimes applied to the Drummond Battery in Port Kembla, New South Wales